Der Mädchenchor Hannover is a girls' choir of girls and young women, based in Hannover, the state capital of Lower Saxony, Germany. Girls and young woman between ages 14 and 20 perform a wide range of repertoire from Renaissance to contemporary music. The choir won prizes at international competitions and made recordings.

History 
Heinz Hennig, the conductor of the Knabenchor Hannover from its founding in 1950 to 2001, founded the girls choir in 1951, and initially led the group. From 1952 to 1977, Ludwig Rutt directed the choir. From 1978 until his death in 1999, Rutt shared the leadership with Gudrun Schröfel, who then took over. Similarly, from 2017 she shared leadership with her designated successor,  who took over in 2019.

The choir recorded for German and international broadcasters, and for CDs. Several former members became musicians, some of them professional singers. The choir has achieved prizes at international competitions beginning in 1964.

Awards 
 1964: International competition Neerpelt / Belgium – first prize
 1981: International competition Guido d' Arezzo / Italiy – first prize
 1982: 1st  in Cologne – first prize
 1983: Let the Peoples Sing – BBC in London – first prize
 1986:  for merits for the city
 1987: International competition Varna / Bulgaria – first prize
 1987: Niedersachsenpreis für Kultur
 1989: Internationaler Kammerchorwettbewerb Marktoberdorf – third prize
 1990: 3rd Deutscher Chorwettbewerb in Stuttgart – first prize
 1995: International Smetana Chorwettbewerb Litomyšl / Czech Republic – first prize and winner
 1997: Johannes-Brahms-Wettbewerb Hamburg – first prize
 2003: Internationaler Kammerchorwettbewerb Marktoberdorf – second prize
 2005: Let the Peoples Sing – WDR in Cologne – second prize
 2006: 7th Deutscher Chorwettbewerb in Kiel – first prize
 2010: ECHO Klassik
 2014: 9th Deutscher Chorwettbewerb Weimar – first prize

Recordings 
 Reger / Humperdinck / Cornelius et al.: Weihnachtliche Chormusik der Romantik – 2019
 Andreas N. Tarkmann: Inka-Kantate "Töchter der Sonne" / Gustav Holst: Savitri (chamber opera) – 2018
 Fauré / Messager: Messe des pêcheur de Villerville and Bach / Pergolesi: Tilge, Höchster, meine Sünden – 2016
 Britten: Children's Crusade / A Ceremony of Carols – 2015
 Johann Michael Haydn / Hans Kössler: Messen für Frauenchor – 2013
 Tarkmann: Didos Geheimnis – 2013
 André Caplet: Le Miroir de Jésus – 2012
 Geliebte Seele – Romantische Lieder und Duette – 2010
 Orff: Carmina Burana – with Knabenchor Hannover, NDR Radiophilharmonie, 2008
 Gaude,Plaude! – Psalmen und Motetten aus italienischen Konventen – with Hannoversche Hofkapelle, 2008
 Gloria! – Weihnachtliche Klänge mit dem Mädchenchor Hannover – with Stockholm Chamber Brass, 2007
 Von Mozart bis Messiaen – with NDR Radiophilharmonie, 2006
 Brahms: Gesänge für Frauenchor, Hörner und Harfe, with NDR Radiophilharmonie, 2003
 Wenn sich die Welt auftut – Europäische Chormusik des 19. und 20. Jahrhunderts – 2000
 Concert for a new Millenium – Mädchenchor Hannover auf der EXPO 2000 – 2000
 Kaleidoskop 2 – 1999
 Brahms: Es tönt ein voller Harfenklang – Weltliche und geistliche Gesänge für Frauenchor, 1996
 Folk songs of the four seasons / Was die Alten sungen – 1996
 Johann Adolf Hasse: Miserere in C minor / Johann Michael Haydn: Missa Sti. Aloysii – with Kammerakademie Hannover, 1995
 Jakobs Stern ist aufgegangen – Weihnachtliche Chormusik – 1992
 Britten: A Ceremony of Carols / Heinrich von Herzogenberg: 6 Mädchenlieder / Petr Eben: Griechisches Wörterbuch – 1990
 Chorwerke der Romantik – 1986
 Kaleidoskop – collection 1982–1993

Film 
 Die Stimme der Mädchen, NDR television 2017, author: Tobias Hartmann, first aired 3 December 2017

References

External links 

 
 
 

German choirs
Choirs of children
Musical groups established in 1951
1951 establishments in West Germany
Musical groups from Hanover